Gyula Kormos (also known as Konorót, December 27, 1911 – October 18, 1980) was a Hungarian field hockey player who competed in the 1936 Summer Olympics.

He was born and died in Budapest.

In 1936 he was a member of the Hungarian team which was eliminated in the group stage of the Olympic tournament. He played two matches as halfback.

External links
profile

1911 births
1980 deaths
Hungarian male field hockey players
Olympic field hockey players of Hungary
Field hockey players at the 1936 Summer Olympics
Sportspeople from Budapest